António de Oliveira Salazar (1889–1970) was Prime Minister of Portugal from 1932 to 1968

Tony or Antonio Salazar may also refer to:

Antonio Sebastián Álvarez de Toledo y Salazar (1622–1715), Spanish nobleman and diplomat
Antonio de Salazar (composer) (c.1650–1715), Mexican composer
Tony Salazar (born 1949), Mexican luchador and ring announcer
Antonio Salazar (baseball) (born 1965), former Spanish baseball player
Antonio Salazar (footballer) (1989–2022), Mexican footballer